Hypervalinemia is a rare autosomal recessive metabolic disorder in which urinary and serum levels of the branched-chain amino acid valine are elevated, without related elevation of the branched-chain amino acids leucine and isoleucine. It is caused by a deficiency of the enzyme valine transaminase.

Presentation 
Presenting in infancy, symptoms include lack of appetite, vomiting, dehydration, hypotonia and failure to thrive.

Genetics 
       
Hypervalinemia is inherited in an autosomal recessive manner. This means the defective gene responsible for the disorder is located on an autosome, and two copies of the defective gene (one inherited from each parent) are required in order to be born with the disorder. The parents of an individual with an autosomal recessive disorder both carry one copy of the defective gene, but usually do not experience any signs or symptoms of the disorder.

Diagnosis

See also
 Isovaleric acidemia
 Maple syrup urine disease
 Propionic acidemia

References

External links 

Amino acid metabolism disorders
Autosomal recessive disorders
Rare diseases